Defending champion Martina Hingis successfully defended her title, by defeating Meghann Shaughnessy 6–2, 6–3 in the final. It was the 1st title for Hingis in the season and the 39th in her career.

Seeds
The first four seeds received a bye into the second round.

Draw

Finals

Top half

Bottom half

Qualifying

Qualifying seeds

Qualifiers

Qualifying draw

First qualifier

Second qualifier

Third qualifier

Fourth qualifier

References

External links
 Main and Qualifying draws
 ITF tournament profile

Women's Singles
Singles